Flemmie Pansy Kittrell (December 25, 1904, Henderson, North Carolina - October 3, 1980) was the first African-American woman to earn a Ph.D. in nutrition. Her research focused on such topics as the levels of protein requirements in adults, the proper feeding of black infants, and the importance of preschool enrichment experiences for children.

Early life

Kittrell was born to James and Alice Kittrell. Education was very important to the Kittrell family: she and her eight siblings were encouraged to do well in school and praised for their accomplishments. Her father often read stories and poems to the family.

Flemmie graduated from high school with honors and received a B.S. degree from Hampton Institute in Hampton, Virginia in 1928. Her professors at Hampton, particularly Thomas Wyatt Turner, encouraged her to continue her studies of science and home economics in graduate school. During a period when there were very few female graduate students, Kittrell accepted a scholarship to Cornell University.

She finished her M.S. in 1930, and received a Ph.D. in nutrition in 1936. Her doctoral dissertation was A study on negro infant feeding practices in a selected community of North Carolina. She was the first African American to gain a PhD in nutrition, and the first African-American woman PhD from Cornell University.

Career
Kittrell started as a high school teacher early in her career.  However, in 1928 she moved on as the director of nutrition at Bennett College in Greensboro, North Carolina.  During 1940-1944 she worked at Hampton Institute in Virginia as a professor in Nutrition, later becoming the dean of women and head of the department of home economics. As a pacifist during the war years, she volunteered for the Women's International League for Peace and Freedom. She also attended the founding meeting of the American Peace Movement (APM) in Chicago in 1940. The APM had ties to the Communist Party even though Kittrell eschewed Communism. However, someone at Hampton sent a tip to the FBI in 1941 claiming that Kittrell received mail from the APM, and so she was surveilled by the FBI for the following 20 years.  In 1944, she left Hampton Institute to become head of the home economics department at Howard University in Washington, D. C. Here she developed a broader curriculum for home economics that included child development. She believed that home economists should be concerned with low-income and minority families in small towns and rural areas. Kittrell also blended the home economics curriculum with courses in other areas such as science and engineering.

In 1947, Kittrell began an international crusade to improve nutrition. She led a group to Liberia, where she found the diet of the people to be severely lacking in proteins and vitamins. Her reports on "hidden hunger", a type of malnutrition in people with full stomachs, led to many changes in the agricultural practices of Liberia and other countries. The government of Liberia gave her an award for her service to the country.

She later traveled to India, Japan, Uganda, Kenya, the Congo, South Africa, Mozambique, Rhodesia, Thailand, Zaire, Angola, Australia, New Zealand, Burma, Bangladesh and Russia. Kittrell used these research trips to compile the American Home Economics Association cookbook, Favorite Recipes from the United Nations. While the FBI was tracking her, she travelled the world under the sponsorship of the United Nations, the Methodist Church, the American Home Economics Association, the Women's International League for Peace and Freedom, the US government Point Four Program, and the Ford Foundation, among others. Kittrell created a college-level training program for home economics in Baroda College, India while a Fulbright Scholar.

In addition to setting up programs abroad, Kittrell designed a program at Howard University to recruit students from other countries. Howard University became known throughout the world as a leader in nutrition and child development. She used both public and private funds to hold seminars on the latest nutritional research, to encourage women to seek advanced degrees, and to help other schools develop quality programs.

In the 1960s, Kittrell was instrumental in creating the Head Start program. Kittrell was frequently honored for her important work. She received the Scroll of Honor from the National Council of Negro Women in 1961.

She retired from teaching in 1972, but continued to work as a consultant and lecturer in various settings. After her retirement in 1973, Howard University named her professor Emerita of the Department of Human Ecology, a position she held until her death in 1980.

During her career, Kittrell improved the quality of life for thousands of people and focused worldwide attention on problems involving malnutrition and child development.

Death
Kittrell died unexpectedly of cardiac arrest on October 3, 1980, in Washington, D.C.

Legacy
The American Home Economics Association created a scholarship in her name.

The Cornell Graduate School created the Turner Kittrell Medal of Honor for alumni who have made significant national or international contributions to the advancement of diversity, inclusion and equity in academia, industry or the public sector.  The first award was in 2017.

References
Kessler, James  H., J.S.Kidd, Renee A. Kidd and Katherine A. Morin. Distinguished African-American Scientists of the 20th Century. Oryx  Press: Phoenix, AZ, 1996.
McMurray, Emily, ed. Notable Twentieth-Century Scientists. Gale Research Inc.: Detroit, 1995.
Sammons, Vivian Ovelton. Blacks in Science and Medicine. Hemisphere Publishing Corporation: New York, 1990.
Flemmie Kittrell: Pioneering Alumna, Cornell University Library.

Specific

Further reading
 Anita Nahal, “Flemmie Kittrell,” in: Henry Louis Gates Jr. & Evelyn Brooks Higginbotham (eds.), African American National Biography, OUP, Vol. 5, 2008.

1904 births
1980 deaths
Cornell University College of Agriculture and Life Sciences alumni
American women nutritionists
American nutritionists
Hampton University alumni